The Green Cathedral or De Groene Kathedraal located near Almere in the Netherlands, is an artistic planting of Lombardy poplars (Populus nigra italica) that mimics the size and shape of the Cathedral of Notre-Dame, Reims, France.

History
The work was planted by Marinus Boezem (b. 1934) on April 16, 1987, in Southern Flevoland. The land art project was installed on polder land; 178 trees were planted on a knoll, a half-metre above the surrounding area. Over the following years, some trees were replaced due to deer damage, and stone was laid in the floor to echo the cross ribs and support beams of the cathedral.

21st century
Now mature, the cathedral has become a location for weddings, funerals, meetings, and religious services of all kinds. Nearby, a clearing has been made in a young beech forest so that the open space is in the shape of the same cathedral. Boezem suggests, as the poplars decline, the beech trees around the clearing will grow to create the church once more, thus ensuring a cyclical evolution of growth, decline, and growth.

Art
There have also been art performances by theater group Suburbia called Judas (2015), Performance Melanie Bonajo - Matrix Botanica, Biosphere Above Nations (2013)

References

Geography of Flevoland
Land art
1987 establishments in the Netherlands
Tourist attractions in Flevoland
Almere